Cordelia is the innermost known moon of Uranus. It was discovered from the images taken by Voyager 2 on January 20, 1986, and was given the temporary designation S/1986 U 7. It was not detected again until the Hubble Space Telescope observed it in 1997. Cordelia takes its name from the youngest daughter of Lear in William Shakespeare's King Lear. It is also designated Uranus VI.

Other than its orbit, radius of 20 km and geometric albedo of 0.08 virtually nothing is known about it. In the Voyager 2 images Cordelia appears as an elongated object with its major axis pointing towards Uranus. The ratio of axes of Cordelia's prolate spheroid is 0.7 ± 0.2.

Cordelia acts as the inner shepherd satellite for Uranus' ε ring. Cordelia's orbit is within Uranus' synchronous orbit radius, and is therefore slowly decaying due to tidal deceleration.

Cordelia is very close to a 5:3 orbital resonance with Rosalind.

See also 

 Moons of Uranus

References 

Explanatory notes

Citations

External links 
 Cordelia Profile by NASA's Solar System Exploration
 Uranus' Known Satellites (by Scott S. Sheppard)

Moons of Uranus
19860120
Moons with a prograde orbit
King Lear